Nong Ben Duo Qing may refer to:

Love Is Payable, a 1997 Taiwanese-Chinese TV series
Entangling Love in Shanghai, a 2010 remake